Cathepsin L1 is a protein that in humans is encoded by the CTSL1 gene. The protein is a cysteine cathepsin, a lysosomal cysteine protease that plays a major role in intracellular protein catabolism.

Function
Cathepsin L1 is a member of the Peptidase C1 (cathepsin) MEROPS family, which plays an important role in diverse processes including normal lysosome mediated protein turnover, antigen and proprotein processing, and apoptosis. Its substrates include collagen and elastin, as well as alpha-1 protease inhibitor, a major controlling element of neutrophil elastase activity. The encoded protein has been implicated in several pathologic processes, including myofibril necrosis in myopathies and in myocardial ischemia, and in the renal tubular response to proteinuria. This protein, which is a member of the peptidase C1 family, is a dimer composed of disulfide-linked heavy and light chains, both produced from a single protein precursor. At least two transcript variants encoding the same protein have been found for this gene.

Viral entry

Cleavage of the SARS-CoV-2 S2 spike protein required for viral entry into cells can be accomplished by proteases TMPRSS2 located on the cell membrane, or by cathepsins (primarily cathepsin L) in endolysosomes. Hydroxychloroquine inhibits the action of cathepsin L in endolysosomes, but because cathepsin L cleavage is minor compared to TMPRSS2 cleavage, hydroxychloroquine does little to inhibit SARS-CoV-2 infection.

Inflammation

Although Cathepsin L is usually characterized as a lysosomal protease, it can be secreted, resulting in pathological inflammation. Cathepsin L and other cysteine cathepsins tend to be secreted by macrophages and other tissue-invading immune cells when causing pathological inflammation.

Interactions
CTSL1 has been shown to interact with Cystatin A.

Distribution
Cathepsin L has been reported in many organisms including fish, birds, mammals, and sponges.

See also 
 Cathepsin L2 (also known as cathepsin V)

References

Further reading

External links
 The MEROPS online database for peptidases and their inhibitors: C01.032
 

Cathepsins
EC 3.4.22
Extracellular matrix remodeling enzymes